"Love Me Less" is a song by American singer-songwriter MAX featuring American singer Quinn XCII from the former's third studio album, Colour Vision. It was released by Colour Vision Records and RED Music on April 5, 2019, as the lead single from the album and MAX's first single of 2019. A new version of the single dropped in September featuring Kim Petras. Also a remix of the song by American DJ Ookay was released.

Promotion
On March 20, 2019, MAX revealed the song, cover art, guest feature, and release date.

Credits and personnel
Adapted from Tidal.
 MAX – composer, associated performer, 
 Quinn XCII – associated performer
 Imad Royal and Rogét – producer, recording engineer
 Rogét Chahayed – producer, composer, piano, recording engineer
 Imad-Roy El-Amine – composer, guitar
 Temrowski – composer
 Nolan Sipe – composer
 Aaron Mattes – assistant engineer
 David Kutch – mastering engineer
 Erik Madrid – mixing engineer

Charts

Certifications

Kim Petras remix

A remix of the song featuring German singer Kim Petras was released on September 5, 2019.

Release history

References

2019 songs
2019 singles
Max Schneider songs
Songs written by Rogét Chahayed
Songs written by Nolan Sipe